Stephen Joseph Bercik, J.S.C., J.D. (1921–2003) served as mayor of Elizabeth, New Jersey between 1956-1964. While mayor, his achievements included the modernization of the city charter, establishment of the Elizabeth Human Relations Committee, helping to develop Elizabeth seaport as a major shipping center, and meadowlands developments.

As an appointee of Governor Richard Hughes, he served on The Waterfront Commission of New York Harbor from 1966-1971.  Following his terms as the Commissioner for New Jersey, in 1972 he was given a judicial appointment in Union County, New Jersey by William T. Cahill. He served as a judge in the Juvenile and Domestic Relations division of the Superior Court of Union County. He served as Presiding Judge from 1977 until he retired in 1988.  A street in Elizabeth was named in Stephen Bercik's honor some time after his time as Judge

References

External links
 http://www.visithistoricalelizabethnj.org/timeline.htm

1921 births
2003 deaths
Mayors of Elizabeth, New Jersey
20th-century American politicians